Metric units are units based on the metre, gram or second and decimal (power of ten) multiples or sub-multiples of these.  The most widely used examples are the units of the International System of Units (SI).  By extension they include units of electromagnetism from the CGS and SI units systems, and other units for which use of SI prefixes has become the norm. Other unit systems using metric units include:
 International System of Electrical and Magnetic Units
 Metre–tonne–second (MTS) system of units
 MKS system of units (metre, kilogram, second)

Metric units that are part of the SI

The first group of metric units are those that are at present defined as units within the International System of Units (SI).  In its most restrictive interpretation, this is what may be meant when the term metric unit is used.

The SI defines 30 named units and associated symbols:
 The unit one (1) is the unit of a quantity of dimension one.
 The second (s) is the unit of time.
 The metre (m) is the unit of length.
 The kilogram (kg) is the unit of mass.
 The ampere (A) is the unit of electric current.
 The kelvin (K) is the unit of thermodynamic temperature.
 The mole (mol) is the unit of amount of substance.
 The candela (cd) is the unit of luminous intensity.
 The hertz (Hz) is equal to one reciprocal second.
 The radian (rad) is equal to one.
 The steradian (sr) is equal to one.
 The newton (N) is equal to one kilogram-metre per second squared.
 The pascal (Pa) is equal to one newton per square metre.
 The joule (J) is equal to one newton-metre.
 The watt (W) is equal to one joule per second.
 The coulomb (C) is equal to one ampere second.
 The volt (V) is equal to one joule per coulomb.
 The weber (Wb) is equal to one volt-second.
 The tesla (T) is equal to one weber per square metre.
 The farad (F) is equal to one coulomb per volt.
 The ohm (Ω) is equal to one volt per ampere.
 The siemens (S) is equal to one ampere per volt.
 The henry (H) is equal to one volt-second per ampere.
 The degree Celsius (°C) is equal to one kelvin.
 The lumen (lm) is equal to one candela-steradian.
 The lux (lx) is equal to one lumen per square metre.
 The becquerel (Bq) is equal to one reciprocal second.
 The gray (Gy) is equal to one joule per kilogram.
 The sievert (Sv) is equal to one joule per kilogram.
 The katal (kat) is equal to one mole per second.

There are twenty-four metric prefixes that can be combined with any of these units except one (1) and kilogram (kg) to form further units of the SI. For mass, the same prefixes are applied to the gram (g) instead of the kilogram.

Metric units that are not part of the SI 

There are several metric systems, most of which have become disused or are still used in only niche disciplines.  Systems are listed with named units that are associated with them.

CGS 

The centimetre–gram–second system of units (CGS) is based on three base units: centimetre, gram and second.  Its subsystems (CGS-ESU, CGS-EMU and CGS-Gaussian) have different defining equations for their systems of quantities for defining electromagnetic quantities and hence the associated units, with CGS-Gaussian units being selected from each of the other two subsystems.

As from the redefinition, μ0 has an inexactly known value when expressed in SI units, with the exactness of the electromagnetic unit correspondence given here being affected accordingly.

CGS nonelectromagnetic units 
 The rayl is a unit of specific acoustic impedance, equal to 1 dyn⋅s⋅cm−3.

CGS-ESU electromagnetic units 
 The statdaraf (statD) is a unit of electric elastance equal to 1/statF.

CGS-EMU electromagnetic units 
 The gilbert (Gb) is a unit of magnetomotive force equal to one biot-turn, corresponding to (10/4π) A = .

CGS-Gaussian electromagnetic units 

MTS 

MKSA 

MKpS units 

 The kilogram-force (kgf), also kilopond (kp), is a unit of force.

Other metric units

Length 
 The micron (μ) is a unit of distance equal to one micrometre.
 The basic module (M) is a unit of distance equal to one hundred millimetres.
 The myriametre (mym) is a unit of distance equal to ten kilometres.
 The hebdometre is a unit of distance equal to ten megametres.
 The spat (S) is a unit of distance equal to one terametre.

Area 
 The shed  is a unit of area used in nuclear physics equal to 10−24 barns (100 rm2 = 10−52 m2).
 The outhouse  is a unit of area used in nuclear physics equal to 10−6 barns (100 am2 = 10−34 m2).
 The barn (b)  is a unit of area used in nuclear physics equal to one hundred femtometres squared (100 fm2 = 10−28 m2).

Volume 
 The lambda (λ) is a unit of volume equal to one cubic millimetre (1 mm3).
 The litre (symbol l or L) is a unit of volume equal to one cubic decimetre (1 dm3).

Reciprocal length 
 The dioptre is a unit of optical power equal to one reciprocal metre.

Time 
 The svedberg (S or Sv) is a unit of time used in chemistry equal to one hundred femtoseconds.
 The shake is a unit of time used in nuclear physics equal to ten nanoseconds.
 The sigma is a unit of time equal to one microsecond.

Reciprocal time 

Reciprocal time squared 

Speed 
 The benz is a unit of speed equal to one metre per second (1 m/s).

Acceleration 

Flow rate 
 The sverdrup (Sv) is a unit of volume flow rate equal to one million metres cubed per second (106 m3/s).

Mass 
 The undecimogramme is a unit of mass equal to ten picograms (10 pg).
 The gamma (γ) is a unit of mass equal to one microgram (1 μg).
 The gravet is a unit of mass equal to one gram (1 g).
 The grave is a unit of mass equal to one kilogram (1 kg).
 The bar is a unit of mass equal to one megagram (1 Mg).

Linear mass density 
 The tex (tex) is a unit of linear mass density equal to one gram per kilometre (1 g/km).
 The number metric (Nm) is equal to 1000 metres per kilogram (1 km/kg).

Pressure 

Energy 

Viscosity 
 The poiseuille is a unit of dynamic viscosity equal to one pascal-second.

Electrical 
 The Siemens mercury unit is a unit of electric resistance, corresponding to ~.

Electromagnetic radiation 
 The jansky (Jy) is a unit of spectral irradiance equal to 10−26 W⋅m−2⋅Hz−1.
 The solar flux unit is a unit of spectral irradiance equal to 10−22 W⋅m−2⋅Hz−1.
 The nox (nx) is a unit of illuminance equal to 1 millilux.
 The nit (nt) is a unit of luminance equal to one candela per metre squared.
 The lambert (L) is a unit of luminance equal to 104/π cd⋅m−2.
 The lumerg is a unit of luminous energy equal to  lumen-seconds (100 nlm s).
 The talbot (T) is a unit of luminous energy equal to one lumen-second.
 The einstein (E) is a unit of amount of photons, equal to one mole (1 mol) of photons.
 The rayleigh (R) is a unit of photon flux rate density equal to 1010 m−2⋅s−1 (104 mm−2⋅s−1).

Radioactivity 
 The rutherford (Rd) is a unit of radioactivity defined as one million decays per second.

Concentration 
 The molar (M) is equal to one mole per litre.

Nonmetric units

Hybrid units 
Some nonmetric units arose as a combination of a nonmetric quantity combined with a metric unit.  Examples include:

Metric unit combined with a unit permitted alongside the SI 
 The watt-hour per day (W⋅h/d) is a unit of power equal to 3.6 kJ/(24 h) = 1/24 W.
 The enzyme unit (U) is equal to one micromole per minute (50/3 nkat).

Other combinations 
 The normal litre per minute (NLPM) is approximately equal to (0.001/60) m3/s.
 The standard litre per minute (SLPM) is approximately equal to (0.001/60) m3/s.
 The torr (Torr) is approximately 133.3224 pascals.
 The electronvolt (eV) is equal to  = . 
 The langley (Ly) is a unit of energy density equal to 1 calorie per square centimetre.

Traditional units standardized in terms of metric units  
Further traditional units were standardized by defining them in terms of metric units, such as the imperial inch, almost always retaining their original name, and replaced the units as traditionally defined.

Nonmetric units that arose as approximations to traditional units that were adjusted for convenient conversion to metric units were typically named as for the traditional unit but qualified with the word "metric". The corresponding original traditional usually remained in use alongside the corresponding "metric" version.

Units equal to an SI unit multiplied by an integer power of 10, and multiplied or divided by 1, 2, 3 or 4

Dimensionless 
 The neper (Np) is a unit of logarithmic ratio equal to 1.
 The percent (%) is equal to one part in a hundred (0.01).
 The permille (‰) is equal to one part in a thousand (0.001).
 The permyriad (‱) is equal to one part in ten thousand.
 The part per million (ppm) is equal to one part in a million.
 The part per billion (ppb) is equal to one part in a billion.
 The part per trillion (ppt) is equal to one part in a trillion.
 The part per quadrillion (ppq) is equal to one part in a quadrillion.

Length 
 The metric inch is equal to twenty five millimetres.
 The cun is equal to one tenth of a chi (approximately 33.3333 mm).
 The metric foot is equal to three hundred millimetres. 
 The chi is equal to one third of a metre (approximately 333.333 mm).
 The metric chain is equal to 20 m.
 The metric lieue is equal to four kilometres.
 The Scandinavian mile (mil) is equal to ten kilometres.

Area 
 The metric dunam is equal to one thousand metres squared.
 The stremma is equal to one thousand metres squared (1000 m2).

Volume 
 The food labeling ounce is equal to 30 cm3.

Mass 
 The li is equal to one ten-thousandth of a jin (50 mg).
 The fen is equal to one thousandth of a jin (500 mg).
 The qian is equal to one hundredth of a jin (5 g).
 The liang (or tael) is equal to one tenth of a jin (50 g).
 The jin (or catty) is equal to 500 g.
 The dan is equal to one hundred jin (50 kg).
 The metric quintal (q) is equal to one hundred kilograms.

Power 
 The donkey power is equal to 250 W.

Other units   

 The mo is equal to one ten-thousandth of a shaku (approximately 0.0303030 mm).
 The rin is equal to one thousandth of a shaku (approximately 0.303030 mm).
 The bu is equal to one hundredth of a shaku (approximately 3.03030 mm).
 The sun is equal to one tenth of a shaku (approximately 30.3030 mm).
 The shaku is equal to 10/33 m (approximately 303.030 mm).
 The jo is equal to ten shaku (approximately 3030.30 mm).
 The tsubo is equal to 400/121 metres squared (approximately 3.306 m2).
 The sho is equal to 2401/1331 litres (approximately 1.804 dm3).
 The hyakume is equal to one tenth of a kan (375 g).
 The kan is equal to 15/4 kilograms (3.75 kg).

See also 
 Electrostatic units
 Gaussian units
 Gravitational metric system
 History of the metric system
 Metric system
 Outline of the metric system
 RKM code
 Unified Code for Units of Measure

Notes

References 

Metric system